Sweet Heart Fever is the debut studio album by singer-songwriter Scout Niblett, released in October 2001 on Secretly Canadian records. Although the album received little media attention, Pitchfork gave the album a highly favorable review.

Track listing

Personnel
Scout Niblett - vocals, guitar, drums, double bass, percussion
Kristian Goddard - drums

Technical personnel 
Andy Miller - engineer

References

2001 debut albums
Scout Niblett albums